Saint-Lyphard is a commune in the Loire-Atlantique department in western France. It is named after Saint Liphardus, a 6th-century AD abbot of the monastery established at Meung-sur-Loire.

See also
 La Baule - Guérande Peninsula
 Communes of the Loire-Atlantique department
 Parc naturel régional de Brière

References

Saintlyphard